The Communist Party of India (Marxist Leninist) Red Star  (in brief CPI (ML) Red Star) was formed in 2009 merging with various factions of CPI (ML), following the Bhopal Special Conference in 2009. with K N Ramachandran as the General Secretary, who has been reelected to the post in the 9th, 10th and 11th Congresses of the Party, which were held in 2011 at Bhubaneswar (Odisha) in 2015 at Lucknow (Uttar Pradesh)  & 2018 at Bengaluru (Karnataka) 5respectively.

History 
Following the first split in CPI and emergence of CPI (M) in 1964, the inner party struggle 
continued leading to the Naxalbari Uprising in 1967 and formation of CPI (ML) in 1969 
followed by the 1970 Congress (Eighth Congress of the Communist Movement in India).

CPI (ML) Red Star was formed by the merger of various fraction of CPI (ML) on 2009 by the 9th Congress at Bhubaneswar. K.N Ramchandran is General Secretary since the very inception of this party. Since 2009 three party congress (9th, 10 th, 11 th) was held. The last Congress (11th Congress) was held in Bangalore and KN Ramchandran again elected as General Secretary of this party.

Role in Bhangor Movement
In West Bengal this party gained momentum in participation in Bhangor against an ongoing power station project. Although many of its members were arrested including women-wing leader Sharmishtha Chowdhury the movement still continued.
Bhangor protesters led by Red Star leader Alik Chakraborty won five seats in Polerhat-2 rural poll despite heavy obstacles from the ruling party including blocking nominations and rigging.

References

External links

2009 establishments in India
Communist parties in India
International Coordination of Revolutionary Parties and Organizations
Maoist organisations in India
Political parties established in 2009
Registered unrecognised political parties in India